SEPTA Transit Police is an American law enforcement agency, which is responsible for policing the mass transit system that is operated by the Southeastern Pennsylvania Transportation Authority (SEPTA) in Philadelphia, Pennsylvania. The police department also operates in the adjacent suburban areas of Delaware, Montgomery, Chester, and Bucks counties in Pennsylvania, and covers transit routes that extend into the states of New Jersey and Delaware.

History

SEPTA Transit Police was created in 1981 by the Pennsylvania General Assembly (the state legislature).  Although the Philadelphia Police Department maintained a transit unit with officers assigned to patrol in the city's subway concourses, these officers were primarily located in the Center City (downtown) area.  It was determined that by creating its own dedicated police force, SEPTA would be able to deal more directly with rising crime throughout its system. Another reason for determining that SEPTA needed its own police force was due to the unreliable performance of portable radios used by city police officers, which often did not work properly in the subway tunnels.  As a result, they could not be depended on if an officer had to pursue a suspect through the tunnel area, or otherwise needed assistance.  This problem still exists today, although recent efforts have been made to address the issue.

SEPTA Transit Police officers attend the Philadelphia Police Academy, and receive the same training as their municipal counterparts.  They are commissioned by the governor of Pennsylvania, and possess the same authority as a Philadelphia police officer while on or around SEPTA property in Philadelphia.  They also have enforcement authority elsewhere in the commonwealth of Pennsylvania, while in the pursuit of official transportation authority business.

SEPTA Transit Police were able to reduce serious crime on its system by 90 percent, since 1990. When it implemented a 'zone' concept policing strategy, where officers were permanently assigned to specific 'zones' throughout the subway system. SEPTA Transit Police also utilize a number of special units that augment its regular patrol division. These include bike patrol; K-9 patrol; S.O.R.T. (Special Operations Response Teams); TAC (plainclothes anti-crime teams); Viper (high visibility anti-terrorism patrols); a community affairs unit that works to educate the riding public about various crime prevention issues; and a criminal investigations section composed of detectives who investigate serious crimes that occur on the transit system. The police department uses an extensive video surveillance network, to help monitor and record incidents that occur throughout the transit system.  The department also participates in various community-based events, in an effort to help build a positive relationship with SEPTA passengers and the general public.

See also

 List of law enforcement agencies in Pennsylvania

References

External links
 SEPTA Transit Police

Transit police departments of the United States
Transit Police
Specialist police departments of New Jersey
Specialist police departments of Pennsylvania